David Anthony Cooper (1949–2008) was an English cathedral organist, who served in Blackburn Cathedral and Norwich Cathedral.

Background

David Anthony Cooper was born on 14 January 1949 in Derby. He was educated at Derby School and was then organ scholar at Lincoln College, Oxford.

He was Director of Music at Queen Elizabeth's Grammar School, Ashbourne from 1973 to 1977., and music master at Queen Elizabeth's Grammar School, Blackburn from 1983 to 1994.

Career

Assistant organist of
Wells Cathedral 1977–1983

Organist of:
Blackburn Cathedral 1983–1994
Norwich Cathedral 1994–1995

References

English classical organists
British male organists
Cathedral organists
1949 births
Alumni of Exeter College, Oxford
2008 deaths
20th-century classical musicians
20th-century English musicians
20th-century organists
20th-century British male musicians
Male classical organists